James Alexander "Jim, Bud" Jarvis (December 7, 1907 – May 7, 1983) was a Canadian professional ice hockey left winger who played three seasons in the National Hockey League for the Pittsburgh Pirates, Philadelphia Quakers and Toronto Maple Leafs between 1929 and 1937. The rest of his career, which lasted from 1929 to 1944, was spent in various minor leagues. He was born in Fort William, Ontario.

Career statistics

Regular season and playoffs

External links

1907 births
1983 deaths
Buffalo Bisons (IHL) players
Canadian ice hockey left wingers
Hershey Bears players
Ice hockey people from Ontario
Sportspeople from Thunder Bay
Philadelphia Quakers (NHL) players
Pittsburgh Pirates (NHL) players
Providence Reds players
Springfield Indians players
Syracuse Stars (AHL) players
Toronto Maple Leafs players
Canadian expatriate ice hockey players in the United States